Archiacanthocephala is a class within the phylum of Acanthocephala. They are parasitic worms that attach themselves to the intestinal wall of terrestrial vertebrates, including humans. They are characterised by the body wall and the lemnisci (which are a bundle of sensory nerve fibers), which have nuclei that divide without spindle formation, or the appearance of chromosomes, or it has a few amoebae-like giant nuclei. Typically, there are eight separate cement glands in the male, which is one of the few ways to distinguish the dorsal and ventral sides of these organisms.

Taxonomy
Genetic data are not available for the genus Apororhynchus in public databases, and Apororhynchus has not been included in phylogenetic analyses thus far due to insufficiency of morphological data. However, the lack of features such as an absence of a muscle plate, a midventral longitudinal muscle, lateral receptacle flexors, and an apical sensory organ when compared to the other three orders of class Archiacanthocephala indicate it is an early offshoot (basal). There are four orders in the class Archiacanthocephala:
Apororhynchida
Gigantorhynchida
Moniliformida
Oligacanthorhynchida

Description
All species in the class Archiacanthocephala are terrestrial and use terrestrial insects and myriapods as intermediate hosts and predatory birds and mammals as a primary host. They attach themselves to the intestinal wall using a hook covered proboscis. The worms are also characterised by the body wall and the lemnisci (which are a bundle of sensory nerve fibers), which have nuclei that divide without spindle formation or the appearance of chromosomes or it has a few amoebae-like giant nuclei.

See also 
List of parasites (human)

References 

 
Acanthocephalans
Animal parasites of vertebrates
Microscopic animals